White Canyon is a canyon in San Juan County, Utah, United States.

Description
The canyon is notable for Ancestral Puebloan cliff dwellings  and slot canyons. It is spanned by Sipapu Bridge, one of the largest natural bridges in the world.

The canyon begins in the foothills of the Abajo Mountains and passes through Natural Bridges National Monument before emptying into Lake Powell. Utah State Route 95 parallels the inner gorge of the canyon for much of its length.

One particularly deep and narrow section of White Canyon is known as the Black Hole. Canyoneers sometimes wear wetsuits to guard against hypothermia while traversing this section. The danger of flash flooding is very high due to the canyon's large drainage basin. A 16-year-old girl drowned in a flash flood while hiking in the Black Hole area in September 1996.

See also

 List of canyons and gorges in Utah

References

External links

Archaeological sites in Utah
Canyons and gorges of Utah
Rock art in North America
Landforms of San Juan County, Utah
Cliff dwellings
Petroglyphs in Utah